Billy MacKenzie (born 7 April 1984 in Edinburgh) is a Scottish former professional motocross racer. He competed in the Motocross World Championships from 1999 to 2013. MacKenzie is a two-time British motocross national champion.

MacKenzie rode for the Honda factory racing team competing in the F.I.M. MX1-GP World Championships. He has also represented the United Kingdom in the Motocross des Nations. In 2010, MacKenzie rode for Kawasaki in Australia.

References

External links
 Billy MacKenzie profile at Kawasaki Australia web site

1984 births
Living people
British motocross riders
Sportspeople from Edinburgh